{{Automatic_taxobox
| taxon = Naganishia
| authority = S. Goto (1963)
| type_species = Naganishia globosa
| type_species_authority = S. Goto
| subdivision_ranks      = Species
| subdivision            = Naganishia adeliensis
N. albidaN. albidosimilisN. antarcticaN. bhutanensisN. cerealisN. diffluensN. friedmanniiN. liquefaciensN. onofriiN. randhawaeN. uzbekistanensisN. vaughanmartiniaeN. vishniacii}}Naganishia is a genus of fungi in the family Filobasidiaceae. Species are currently only known from their yeast states, most of which were formerly referred to the genus Cryptococcus. Some 15 species have been described worldwide. Naganishia albida'' is an occasional human pathogen.

References

Tremellomycetes